Christian Philipp Wolff (17 June 1772, Bad Arolsen - 27 August 1820, Berlin) was a German sculptor and master builder.

Life and work 
He was born to Johann Wilhelm Wolff (1725–1784), the valet and court tailor of Waldeck, and his wife Anna Elisabeth Christina, née Sude (died 1790), from Heringhausen.

He attended school in Bad Arolsen, then completed an apprenticeship with the court sculptor .

After 1797, he worked as a sculptor in Neustrelitz, the royal capital of Mecklenburg-Strelitz. In 1809, he married Maria Christiane Wilhelmine Siemers, daughter of the Chief Forester. They had four children, one of whom, Albert, also became a sculptor.

In 1811, his death mask of Queen Louise was used by his friend, Christian Daniel Rauch, to create the Queen's grave monument.

At that time, his occupation was "construction manager". After 1816, he was a Master Builder; then the official Court Builder.

He was a Freemason and a co-founder of the St. Johannis Lodge, "Zum Friedensbunde" (peace alliance) in Neubrandenburg.

Sources 
 "Wolff, Christian Philipp". In: Hans Vollmer (Ed.): Allgemeines Lexikon der Bildenden Künstler von der Antike bis zur Gegenwart. Vol.36: Wilhelmy–Zyzywi. E. A. Seemann, Leipzig 1947, pg.193.
 Konrad Hustaedt: "Christian Philipp Wolff. Ein Mecklenburg-Strelitzer Hofbaumeister und Bildhauer". In: Mecklenburg-Strelitzer Heimatblätter. #7, 1931, Vol.4, pp.53–58.
 Sven-Hinrich Siemers: "Der Mecklenburg-Strelitzer Hofbaumeister Wolff. Ein vergessener Waldecker Bildhauer". In: Geschichtsblätter für Waldeck. Vol.97, 2009, pp.102–111.

External links 

 

1772 births
1820 deaths
German sculptors
German builders
People from Bad Arolsen